John Andrew Stenson (born 16 December 1949) is an English footballer who played as a midfielder in the Football League for Charlton Athletic, Mansfield Town, Peterborough United and Aldershot and in the NASL for Denver Dynamos.

References

External links

1949 births
Living people
English footballers
Footballers from Catford
Association football midfielders
Charlton Athletic F.C. players
Mansfield Town F.C. players
Peterborough United F.C. players
Aldershot F.C. players
Denver Dynamos players
Basingstoke Town F.C. players
English Football League players
North American Soccer League (1968–1984) players
English expatriate sportspeople in the United States
Expatriate soccer players in the United States
English expatriate footballers